Codex Daltonianus, known as Minuscule 1423 (in the Gregory-Aland numbering), designated by A119  (in the Soden numbering), is a Greek minuscule manuscript of the New Testament, written on a paper. Palaeographically it had been assigned to the 14th century (or about 1200).

Description 

The codex contains the complete text of the four Gospels on 352 paper leaves (29.0 by 21.8 cm), with marginal commentaries (approx. 47 lines). The text is written in one column per page, in 21 and more lines per page. The headings are ornamented.

Kurt Aland did not place it in any Category.
It was not examined by the Claremont Profile Method.

History 

Lake described it in 1902. It was added to the list of the New Testament manuscripts by C. R. Gregory.

The codex now is located in the Kenneth Willis Clark Collection of the Duke University (Gk MS 601)  at Durham.

See also 

 List of New Testament minuscules (1001-2000)
 Biblical manuscripts
 Textual criticism

References

Further reading 

  Lampros, Sp. P., „Καταλογος των εν τη βιβλιοθηκη της ιερας μονης ικοσιφοινισσης”, ‘Ηλληνομνημων, XVII (1923), pp. 306–311.

External links 
 The Kenneth Willis Clark Collection of Greek Manuscripts 
 Codex Daltonianus at the Kenneth Willis Clark Collection of Greek Manuscripts

Greek New Testament minuscules
14th-century biblical manuscripts
Duke University Libraries